The 1973–74 Boston Bruins season was the Bruins' 50th season in the NHL.  They made it back to the Stanley Cup finals, but lost to the Philadelphia Flyers in six games.

Offseason

NHL draft

Regular season

Season standings

Playoffs

Quarterfinals

Semifinals

Stanley Cup Finals
The Bruins returned to the Stanley Cup, but were defeated by the Flyers in six games.

Schedule and results

Notable games
January 24: Bobby Orr is ejected by referee Wally Harris for arguing that he was tripped by Chicago's Bill White. The ejection draws a heated response from Harry Sinden and the Boston Garden crowd.

Player statistics

Regular season
Scoring

Goaltending

Playoffs
Scoring

Goaltending

Awards and records
 Prince of Wales Trophy
 Phil Esposito, Art Ross Trophy winner
 Phil Esposito, Hart Memorial Trophy winner
 Phil Esposito, NHL leader, goals (68) 
 Phil Esposito, NHL leader, points (145)
 Bobby Orr, Norris Trophy
 Bobby Orr, NHL leader, assists (90)
 Single-game record for points in one game: (7) on November 15, 1973, by Bobby Orr

See also
1974 Stanley Cup Final

References
 Bruins on Hockey Database

Boston Bruins seasons
Boston Bruins
Boston Bruins
Boston Bruins
Boston Bruins
Bruins
Bruins